Chester Almeron Fowler (December 24, 1862April 8, 1948) was an American judge in the state of Wisconsin.  He was a justice of the Wisconsin Supreme Court for the last 19 years of his life, after serving 25 years as a Wisconsin Circuit Court Judge.

Biography

Fowler was born Chester Almeron Fowler to Franklin Dwight and Maria Fowler in Rubicon, Wisconsin. On May 30, 1892, he married Carrie J. Smith. He graduated from what is now the University of Wisconsin–Whitewater and taught school. He studied law in Iowa and graduated from the University of Wisconsin. He then practiced law in Omaha, Nebraska, until returning to Wisconsin with his law partner.

Career
Fowler was a circuit judge in Wisconsin from 1905 to 1929. He was appointed to the Wisconsin Supreme Court at the end of 1929 to replace the deceased Chief Justice Aad J. Vinje.  The following spring, he won election to the remainder of the term and was re-elected twice more before dying in office in 1948.

Electoral history

Wisconsin Supreme Court (1916)

| colspan="6" style="text-align:center;background-color: #e9e9e9;"| General Election, April 1916

Wisconsin Supreme Court (1930, 1931, 1941)

| colspan="6" style="text-align:center;background-color: #e9e9e9;"| General Election, April 1, 1930

| colspan="6" style="text-align:center;background-color: #e9e9e9;"| General Election, April 7, 1931

| colspan="6" style="text-align:center;background-color: #e9e9e9;"| General Election, April 1, 1941

References

|-

People from Rubicon, Wisconsin
University of Wisconsin Law School alumni
University of Wisconsin–Whitewater alumni
Justices of the Wisconsin Supreme Court
Wisconsin state court judges
1862 births
1948 deaths